The 2011 Oceania Athletics Championships were held at the Apia Park in Apia, Samoa, between June 21–23, 2011.

There were significant changes in the format of the competition.  Medals are now awarded in both of the newly formed two regional divisions "East" and "West".

A total of 35 events were contested, 18 by men and 17 by women.

Regional Division East

Medal summary
Complete results can be found on the Oceania Athletics Association webpage.

Men

Women

Medal Table East (unofficial)
A medal table was published for both east and west divisions.

Participation East (unofficial)
The participation of 77 athletes from 11 countries from the east region could
be determined.

East regional division:

 (7)
 (3)
 (10)
 (9)
 (4)
 (12)
 (6)
 (1)
 (18)
 (4)
 (3)

Regional Division West

Medal summary
Complete results can be found on the Oceania Athletics Association webpage.

Men

†:  was listed 4th
in 59.59, but there was no information on the 3rd.

Women

Medal Table West (unofficial)
A medal table was published for both east and west divisions.

Participation West (unofficial)
The participation of 67 athletes from 11 countries from the west region could be determined.

West regional division:

 (12)
 (14)
 (4)
 (4)
 (4)
 (4)
 (4)
 (4)
 (8)
 (4)
 (5)

References

Oceania Athletics Championships
Athletics in Samoa
Oceania Championships
2011 in Samoan sport
International sports competitions hosted by Samoa
June 2011 sports events in Oceania